The Original Melbourne Village Hall is a historic building currently located on Hall Road in Melbourne Village, Florida, United States.  This building was built circa 1941 during World War II to serve as a military barracks at the Naval Air Station Banana River.  After World War II, the U.S. government declared the building surplus and subsequently sold it to the American Homesteading Foundation located at Melbourne Village.

In May 1948, the building was moved to its current location and used as a community center. Upon becoming incorporated, the Town of Melbourne Village used the building from 1957 until 1963 as office space until a new town hall was constructed.  In 2003, Melbourne Village completed restorations of the building and renamed it Hester Wagner Community House in December of that year.

See also

Melbourne Village
Naval Air Station Banana River
Village hall

Notes

Gallery

External links
Original Melbourne Village Hall. Information from the Florida Historical Markers Program website.

Buildings and structures in Brevard County, Florida